Ascension is the name of several ships

 , Colony-class frigate, formerly USS Hargood (PF-74)
 , cargo and container ship, U.S.-flagged and Turkish-built, formerly MV Chekov

Fictional

 Project Ascension, project to create and use Orion-class spaceships from Ascension (TV series)
 USS Ascension, fictional spaceship setting from Ascension (TV series)

Ship names